The B-cell lymphomas are types of lymphoma affecting B cells.  Lymphomas are "blood cancers" in the lymph nodes. They develop more frequently in older adults and in immunocompromised individuals.

B-cell lymphomas include both Hodgkin's lymphomas and most non-Hodgkin lymphomas. They are typically divided into low and high grade, typically corresponding to indolent (slow-growing) lymphomas and aggressive lymphomas, respectively. As a generalisation, indolent lymphomas respond to treatment and are kept under control (in remission) with long-term survival of many years, but are not cured. Aggressive lymphomas usually require intensive treatments, with some having a good prospect for a permanent cure.

Prognosis and treatment depends on the specific type of lymphoma as well as the stage and grade. Treatment includes radiation and chemotherapy. Early-stage indolent B-cell lymphomas can often be treated with radiation alone, with long-term non-recurrence. Early-stage aggressive disease is treated with chemotherapy and often radiation, with a 70–90% cure rate.  Late-stage indolent lymphomas are sometimes left untreated and monitored until they progress. Late-stage aggressive disease is treated with chemotherapy, with cure rates of over 70%.

Types

There are numerous kinds of lymphomas involving B cells. The most commonly used classification system is the WHO classification, a convergence of more than one, older classification systems.

Common
Five account for nearly three out of four patients with non-Hodgkin lymphoma:
 Diffuse large B-cell lymphoma (DLBCL)
 Follicular lymphoma
 Marginal zone B-cell lymphoma (MZL) or mucosa-associated lymphatic tissue lymphoma (MALT)
 Small lymphocytic lymphoma (SLL, also known as chronic lymphocytic leukemia, CLL)
 Mantle cell lymphoma (MCL)

Rare
The remaining forms are much less common:
 DLBCL variants or sub-types of
 Primary mediastinal (thymic) large B cell lymphoma
 T cell/histiocyte-rich large B-cell lymphoma
 Primary cutaneous diffuse large B-cell lymphoma, leg type (Primary cutaneous DLBCL, leg type)
 EBV positive diffuse large B-cell lymphoma of the elderly
 Diffuse large B-cell lymphoma associated with chronic inflammation
 Fibrin-associated diffuse large B-cell lymphoma
 Primary testicular diffuse large B-cell lymphoma
 Burkitt's lymphoma
 Lymphoplasmacytic lymphoma, which may manifest as Waldenström's macroglobulinemia
 Nodal marginal zone B cell lymphoma (NMZL)
 Splenic marginal zone lymphoma (SMZL)
 Intravascular lymphomas variants
 Intravascular large B-cell lymphoma
 Intravascular NK-cell lymphoma
 Intravascular T-cell lymphoma
 Primary effusion lymphoma
 Lymphomatoid granulomatosis
 Primary central nervous system lymphoma
 ALK+ large B-cell lymphoma
 Plasmablastic lymphoma
 Large B-cell lymphoma arising in HHV8-associated multicentric Castleman's disease
 B-cell lymphoma, unclassifiable with features intermediate between diffuse large B-cell lymphoma and Burkitt lymphoma
 B-cell lymphoma, unclassifiable with features intermediate between diffuse large B-cell lymphoma and classical Hodgkin lymphoma

Other
Additionally, some researchers separate out lymphomas that appear to result from other immune system disorders, such as AIDS-related lymphoma.

Classic Hodgkin's lymphoma and nodular lymphocyte predominant Hodgkin's lymphoma are now considered forms of B-cell lymphoma.

Diagnosis
When a person appears to have a B-cell lymphoma, the main components of a workup (for determining the appropriate therapy and the person's prognosis) are:
 Establishing the precise subtype: Initially, an incisional or excisional biopsy is preferred. A core needle biopsy is discouraged except in case a lymph node is not easily accessible. Fine-needle aspiration is only acceptable in selected circumstances, in combination with immunohistochemistry and flow cytometry.
 Determining the extent of the disease (localized or advanced; nodal or extranodal)
 The person's general health status.

Associated chromosomal translocations
Chromosomal translocations involving the immunoglobulin heavy locus is a classic cytogenetic abnormality for many B-cell lymphomas, including follicular lymphoma, mantle cell lymphoma and Burkitt's lymphoma. In these cases, the immunoglobulin heavy locus forms a fusion protein with another protein that has pro-proliferative or anti-apoptotic abilities. The enhancer element of the immunoglobulin heavy locus, which normally functions to make B cells produce massive production of antibodies, now induces massive transcription of the fusion protein, resulting in excessive pro-proliferative or anti-apoptotic effects on the B cells containing the fusion protein.

In Burkitt's lymphoma and mantle cell lymphoma, the other protein in the fusion is c-myc (on chromosome 8) and cyclin D1 (on chromosome 11), respectively, which gives the fusion protein pro-proliferative ability. In follicular lymphoma, the fused protein is
Bcl-2 (on chromosome 18), which gives the fusion protein anti-apoptotic abilities.

See also
 Richter's transformation
 T-cell lymphoma

References

External links 

Lymphoma